Written and illustrated by Kazuki Funatsu, the chapters of the Addicted to Curry series have been in Shueisha's Weekly Young Jump magazine. Since its serialization over four-hundred chapters have been released in Japan. The first volume of Addicted to Curry was released on July 19, 2001 and as of January 18, 2013 forty-nine volumes have been released.



Volume list

References 

Addicted to Curry